Ebenezer Fisher represented Dedham, Massachusetts in the Great and General Court. The Fisher School, now in Westwood, Massachusetts, was named in his honor. He served as selectman in 1785. He voted against the Norfolk and Bristol Turnpike as a member of the legislature in 1802. Fisher Ames was a driver for the road, and his brother Nathaniel believed his no vote made him a "traitor" motivated by "an ancient prejudice against the Old Parish," i.e. modern day Dedham.

References

Works cited

Members of the Massachusetts General Court
Year of birth missing
Year of death missing
Dedham, Massachusetts selectmen